Mark Gillespie may refer to:

 Mark Gillespie (English singer) (born 1970), English musician living in Germany
 Mark Gillespie (Scottish singer), Scottish singer and part of the English boyband Big Fun
 Mark Gillespie (Irish cricketer) (born 1969)
 Mark Gillespie (New Zealand cricketer) (born 1979), New Zealand cricketer
 Mark Gillespie (footballer) (born 1992), English footballer
 Mark Gillespie (Australian musician) (died 2021), Australian singer-songwriter